John Riley (born February 14, 1964 in Marin County, California) is an American rower.

Riley began his career at the University of Rhode Island in 1982. Between 1986 and 1995, he raced on ten United States National Championship teams, rowed in two Olympic Games (1988:  Seoul, South Korea; 1992:  Barcelona, Spain), and participated in the 1990 Goodwill Games. In August 1986, he won the gold medal in the heavyweight fours without coxswain at the World Rowing Championships in Nottingham, England. His teammates were Ted Swinford, Robert Espeseth and Dan Lyons. At the 1996 Olympics in Atlanta, he sustained injuries in a car accident, which prevented him from rowing in the finals. 

In 1996 he was inducted to the United States Rowing Hall of Fame, and in 1999 he was inducted into the University of Rhode Island's Athletic Hall of Fame.

In  2007 Riley  took the US ltwt men's 2x, Liverman and Montgomery, to the World Championships in Munich, Germany.  He also coached them at the 2007 Pan American Games in Rio de Janeiro, Brazil where they won a silver medal; he also took PennAC's collegiate men's sweep program.

Riley resides in Philadelphia, Pennsylvania, where he is a rowing coach

References

External links 
 
 

1964 births
Living people
American male rowers
People from Marin County, California
Rowers at the 1992 Summer Olympics
World Rowing Championships medalists for the United States
Olympic rowers of the United States
Competitors at the 1990 Goodwill Games